Łukasz Budziłek (born 19 March  1991) is a Polish professional footballer who plays as a goalkeeper for Polish club Motor Lublin.

References

External links
 
 
 
 

1991 births
Living people
GKS Bełchatów players
GKS Katowice players
Polish footballers
Association football goalkeepers
People from Bełchatów
Ekstraklasa players
I liga players
III liga players
Legia Warsaw players
Legia Warsaw II players
Lechia Gdańsk players
Lechia Gdańsk II players
Chojniczanka Chojnice players
Wigry Suwałki players
Pogoń Szczecin players
Bruk-Bet Termalica Nieciecza players
Motor Lublin players
Sportspeople from Łódź Voivodeship